KXVR-LP (107.9 FM, "Alcance Broadcast Network") is a radio station broadcasting a religious format. Licensed to Corpus Christi, Texas, United States, the station serves the Corpus Christi area. The station is currently owned by Comunidad Cristiana of Corpus Christi.

References

External links
 

XVR-LP
XVR-LP
XVR-LP